Nordlund House is a historic house in central Denver, Colorado. Designed by Eugene G. Groves, it is a seven-level building and 3,000 square foot dwelling. The exterior is precast and poured-in-place, reinforced concrete, a process that was patented by Groves and made by his construction company. The exterior walls have rounded corners and are finished in stucco. There is a rooftop terrace and a domed living room roof. Decorative elements include wrought iron and red glazed tiles. 

Concrete is used within the interior of the house, including the built-in seating in the kitchen, kitchen countertops and cabinet faces, and bookcases. The house has an irregular, seven-level floor plan. It was placed on the National Register of Historic Places on February 12, 1998.

References

1939 establishments in the United States
Houses in Denver
National Register of Historic Places in Denver